Judy Lieberman is a professor of pediatrics at Harvard Medical School and holds an endowed chair in cellular and molecular medicine at Boston Children's Hospital.

Early life 
Judy Lieberman was born in September 1947, in Boston, Massachusetts, and grew up in New Jersey with her parents and two sisters Phyllis and Donna.

Career 
Lieberman received a bachelor's degree from Harvard College in physics in 1969, a PhD from The Rockefeller University in theoretical physics in 1974, and an MD from Harvard University in 1981. She then did a residency in Internal Medicine and a fellowship in hematology-oncology at Tufts University School of Medicine's New England Medical Center where she did research in Sheldon M. Wolff's lab. In 1986, she joined the faculty at Tufts as an instructor of internal medicine. From 1987 to 1995, she was an assistant professor. In 1996, she moved to Harvard University, where she was an assistant professor of pediatrics.

Research in the Lieberman lab focuses on immunotherapy, cellular-based therapies, and RNA interference.

From 1991 to 1995, she was a Pew Scholar in the Biomedical Sciences. She was elected to the National Academy of Sciences in 2020.

Personal life 
Lieberman married Edward Greer while in graduate school. She has her first child while in medical school and her second during her residency.

References 

Members of the United States National Academy of Sciences
Harvard University alumni
Harvard Medical School faculty
Harvard Medical School alumni
Tufts University School of Medicine faculty
American women physicians
Living people
American women academics
21st-century American women
Members of the National Academy of Medicine
1947 births